Natasha Hassanandani (born 14 April 1981), professionally known as Anita Hassanandani is an Indian actress who predominantly worked in Telugu, Kannada and Tamil films. Currently she appears in Hindi television serials.

Early life 
Hassanandani was born into a Sindhi Hindu family in Mumbai on 14 April 1981.

Career 
Hassanandani made her debut on television with Idhar Udhar Season 2. She made her film debut in Telugu with Nuvvu Nenu in 2001 Tamil with Samurai in 2002 although Varushamellam Vasantham released first. She made her Hindi film debut with the 2003 thriller Kucch To Hai. She later worked in the films Krishna Cottage, a supernatural thriller; and Koi Aap Sa. She also starred in the television show Kkavyanjali, playing the protagonist Anjali, a middle-class girl marrying into a business tycoon's family. Other than her mainstream Bollywood film and television screen performances, she has also worked in some South Indian movies including Nenu Pelliki Ready, Thotti Gang , Ragada as Bank Employee and Nuvvu Nenu which later was remade as Yeh Dil in Hindi with Tusshar Kapoor. She appeared in a song in a Telugu movie, Nenunnanu. She also starred in Kannada blockbuster movie Veera Kannadiga opposite Kannada superstar Puneeth Rajkumar

Since 2013, she became famous from the role of Shagun Arora/Bhalla on the television show Yeh Hai Mohabbatein. She was a wild card entry in season 8 of Jhalak Dikhhla Jaa. From June 2018 to May 2019, she played Vishakha a.k.a. Vish in Ekta Kapoor's Naagin 3.
 
Further in July 2019 she went on to participate in the 9th season of dance reality show Nach Baliye with her beau and emerged as the first runner-up.

In January she reprised her role as Vishakha in Naagin : Bhagya Ka Zehreela Khel and made a cameo appearance in Naagin 5 in August 2020.
In February 2022 5th-6th she again appeared as Vishakha for Basant Panchami Special on Colors.

Personal life 

Hassanandani married corporate professional Rohit Reddy in Goa on 14 October 2013. On 10 October 2020, she announced her pregnancy in an Instagram video featuring Reddy and herself. The couple had their first child, a boy on 9 February 2021. They named their son as Aaravv Reddy.
 
Before meeting Rohit, Anita was dating Eijaz Khan who she first met at the sets of a famous TV serial Kkavyanjali. Anita parted her ways with Eijaz in 2010 after knowing that he was cheating on her with Canadian singer Natalie De Luccio.

Filmography

Films

Television

Web series

Music videos

Awards

See also
 List of Indian television actresses

References

External links

Anita Hassanandani at IMDb

1981 births
Living people
Female models from Mumbai
Actresses in Hindi television
Actresses in Hindi cinema
Actresses in Telugu cinema
Actresses in Kannada cinema
Actresses in Tamil cinema
Indian film actresses
Actresses from Mumbai
Indian television actresses
Fear Factor: Khatron Ke Khiladi participants
Sindhi people
20th-century Indian actresses
21st-century Indian actresses